Sayed Jamaluddin Afghani University-Kunar is a public university in Asadabad, capital of eastern Kunar province of Afghanistan. It was established in 2010. The university is named after Jamal ad-Din al-Afghani, the Islamic ideologist of the 19th century. 

Sayed Jamaluddin Afghani University-Kunar has two compounds. The main compound of the university is in Salar Bagh or Baghe-e Salar, which includes the university's faculties and centers: the administration office, the faculty of economy, the faculty of agriculture, the computer information and communication technology (ICT) center, and a separate area for the female scholars' hostel.

The second compound is located in Bela village, or east of the administration compound, and has a wider area as compared to the administration compound. This area is just a few kilometers away from the central administration office. Buildings and centers in this compound are the faculty of computer science, the faculty of education, the Shawkat Zamani computer lab, the university's main library, the university mosque, a dining building for scholars, and three buildings for male scholars (Block A, Block B, and a new hostel for male students).

The university was started offering admission in three faculties: education, theology and agriculture. Over the years it expanded its operation and currently is considered a reliable institution in the region offering admissions in five faculties and 21 degree programs, adding Economics and Computer Science and concerned departments to the list.

References

External links 
 

Universities in Afghanistan
Kunar Province
Public universities in Afghanistan
2010 establishments in Afghanistan
Educational institutions established in 2010